Bothriochloa campii is a species of grass in the family Poaceae. It is found only in Ecuador.

References

campii
Endemic flora of Ecuador
Endangered plants
Taxonomy articles created by Polbot